The swimming competitions at the 2022 Mediterranean Games in Oran was held from 1 to 5 July at the Aquatic Center of the Olympic Complex in Bir El Djir.

Schedule

Medal summary

Men's events 

 Swimmers who participated in the heats only and received medals.

Women's events

Medal table

References

External links
2022 Mediterranean Games – Swimming
Results book

 
Sports at the 2022 Mediterranean Games
2022
Mediterranean Games